Fun Labs Romania SRL is a Romanian video game developer based in Bucharest. Founded in 1999, it long worked with Activision on a multitude of projects, including several Cabela's games.

Games developed 
 2001: Cabela's 4x4 Off-Road Adventure (PC)
 2001: Secret Service: In Harm's Way (PC)
 2002: Shadow Force: Razor Unit (PC)
 2002: Cabela's Big Game Hunter (PlayStation 2)
 2003: U.S. Most Wanted: Nowhere to Hide (PC)
 2003: Delta Ops: Army Special Forces (PC)
 2003: Cabela's 4x4 Off-Road Adventure 3 (PC)
 2003: Revolution (PC)
 2003: Cabela's Big Game Hunter: 2004 Season (PC)
 2003: Cabela's Deer Hunt: 2004 Season (Xbox, PlayStation 2)
 2003: Cabela's Dangerous Hunts (Xbox, PlayStation 2)
 2004: Cabela's Big Game Hunter 2005 Adventures (PC, Xbox, PlayStation 2)
 2004: Rapala Pro Fishing (PC, Xbox, PlayStation 2)
 2005: Сabela's Big Game Hunter 2005 Season (Xbox)
 2005: Cabela's Big Game Hunter 2005 Adventures (PC, GameCube, Xbox, PlayStation 2)
 2005: Cabela's Outdoor Adventures (GameCube, PlayStation 2, Xbox)
 2005: Cabela's Dangerous Hunts 2 (PC, GameCube, Xbox, PlayStation 2)
 2005: SeaWorld: Shamu's Deep Sea Adventures (PC, GameCube, Xbox)
 2006: Cabela's Dangerous Hunts: Ultimate Challenge (PlayStation Portable)
 2006: Cabela's Alaskan Adventures (PC, PlayStation 2, Xbox 360)
 2006: Rapala Trophies (PlayStation Portable)
 2006: Harley-Davidson: Race to the Rally (PC, PlayStation 2)
 2006: Cabela's African Safari (PC, PlayStation 2, PlayStation Portable, Xbox 360)
 2006: Rapala Tournament Fishing (Xbox 360, Wii)
 2007: Cabela's Trophy Bucks (Wii, PlayStation 2, Xbox 360)
 2007: Cabela's Big Game Hunter (Wii, PlayStation 2, Xbox 360)
 2007: Cabela's Monster Bass (PlayStation 2)
 2007: The History Channel: Battle for the Pacific (Wii, PlayStation 2)
 2008: Rapala Fishing Frenzy 2009 (Wii, PlayStation 3, Xbox 360)
 2008: Cabela's Dangerous Hunts 2009 (Wii, PlayStation 2, PlayStation 3, Xbox 360)
 2008: Championship Paintball 2009 (Wii, PlayStation 2, PlayStation 3, Xbox 360)
 2008: Cabela's Legendary Adventures (Wii, PlayStation 2, PlayStation Portable)
 2009: Cabela's Outdoor Adventures (PC, Wii, PlayStation 2, PlayStation 3, Xbox 360)
 2009: Chaotic: Shadow Warriors (Wii, PlayStation 3, Xbox 360)
 2010: Cabela's Monster Buck Hunter (Wii)
 2010: Cabela's North American Adventures (PlayStation 2, PlayStation 3, PlayStation Portable, Wii, Xbox 360)
 2010: Rapala Pro Bass Fishing (PlayStation 2, PlayStation 3, PlayStation Portable, Wii, Xbox 360)
 2011: Cabela's Survival: Shadows of Katmai (PlayStation 3, Wii, Xbox 360)
 2012: MIB: Alien Crisis (PlayStation 3, Wii, Xbox 360)
 2012: Cabela's Hunting Expeditions (PlayStation 3, Wii, Xbox 360, PC)
 2013: Angry Birds Trilogy (Wii, Wii U)
 2013: Cabela's African Adventures (PC, PlayStation 3, PlayStation 4, Wii, Xbox 360, Xbox One)
 2014: Duck Dynasty (PC, PlayStation 3, PlayStation 4, Xbox 360, Xbox One)
 2015: Prototype: Biohazard Bundle (PlayStation 4, Xbox One)
 2015: Tony Hawk's Pro Skater 5 (PlayStation 3, Xbox 360)
 2020: Stranded Deep (PlayStation 4, Xbox One)
 2020: Unturned (PlayStation 4, Xbox One, Xbox Series X/S)
 2021: Open Country (PC, PlayStation 4, Xbox One, Xbox Series X/S)
 2021: Nerf Legends (PC, PlayStation 4, PlayStation 5, Xbox One, Xbox Series X/S)

References

External links 
 

Video game companies established in 1999
Romanian companies established in 1999
Video game companies of Romania
Video game development companies
Companies based in Bucharest